Tõrma may refer to several places in Estonia:

Tõrma, Lääne-Viru County, village in Rakvere Parish, Lääne-Viru County
Tõrma, Rapla County, village in Rapla Parish, Rapla County

See also
Torma (disambiguation)